Appassionata is a 1944 Swedish drama film directed by Olof Molander.

Cast
 Georg Rydeberg as Thomas Dahlhoff
 Viveca Lindfors as Maria
 Alf Kjellin as Eric
 Georg Funkquist as Hellenius
 Harriet Bosse as Fru Lenander
 Hilda Borgström as Jönsson
 Hans Strååt as Gösta

References

External links
 

1944 films
1944 drama films
Swedish drama films
Swedish black-and-white films
1940s Swedish-language films
1940s Swedish films